Hodgson and Thompson v. Bowerbank, 9 U.S. (5 Cranch) 303 (1809), was a United States Supreme Court case that held part of the Judiciary Act of 1789 unconstitutional. The invalidated portion conferred federal courts jurisdiction to try cases between aliens.

References

External links
 

United States Supreme Court cases
1809 in United States case law
United States Supreme Court cases of the Marshall Court